Gynenomis mindanaoensis is a moth in the family Crambidae. It was described by Eugene G. Munroe and Akira Mutuura in 1968. It is found on Mindanao in the Philippines.

References

Moths described in 1968
Pyraustinae